Kalamui (also Romanized as Kalāmū’ī; also known as Bāgh-e Ḩeyrān and Bāgh Ḩeyrān) is a village in Khanmirza Rural District, Khanmirza District, Lordegan County, Chaharmahal and Bakhtiari Province, Iran. At the 2006 census, its population was 839, in 175 families. The village is populated by Lurs.

References 

Populated places in Lordegan County
Luri settlements in Chaharmahal and Bakhtiari Province